''

Seid Hadžić (Cyrillic: Сеид Хаџић; born 14 March 1986) is a Montenegrin politician serving as the president of the Justice and Reconciliation Party in Montenegro, minority party representing Bosniaks in Montenegro, succeeding Hazbija Kalač in 2022.

References

People from Rožaje
Bosniaks of Montenegro
1986 births
Living people